Southeastern Massachusetts consists of those portions of Massachusetts located along Buzzards Bay, including the cities of New Bedford and Fall River and their respective suburbs.   Despite the location of Cape Cod and the islands to its south, which are the southeasternmost parts of the state, they are not always grouped in this designation. At its broadest definition, it includes all of Massachusetts south of Boston, southeast of Worcester, and east of Providence, Rhode Island, while at its narrowest definition, it is Bristol County and the Western portion of Plymouth County.

Definition

As Southeastern Massachusetts is not an official designation, its borders are not exactly defined.

At its broadest definition, it includes all of Plymouth and Bristol counties (particularly the South Coast along Buzzards Bay and the South Shore along Cape Cod Bay), most of the cities and towns in Norfolk County, and even some towns in Worcester County. At its narrowest definition, it includes all of Bristol County, the western part of Plymouth County and the southwestern part of Norfolk County, with the South Shore and Metro-South areas being counted separately.

The terms "Southeastern Massachusetts," "Southeastern New England", and "Southern New England" are much-used by Providence-area broadcasters and other local companies and organizations but are not used as frequently in other parts of Massachusetts.

Characteristics

The Southeastern Regional Planning and Economic Development District (SRPEDD) task force, which concerns Southeastern Massachusetts in its broadest definition, describes:
For this effort, southeastern Massachusetts is defined as fifty-two cities and towns from Bristol, Plymouth and Norfolk Counties. The region is geographically defined by Massachusetts Bay, Buzzards Bay, The Taunton River watershed, and its location relative to Boston, Rhode Island and Cape Cod. Bristol County, Massachusetts and Bristol County, Rhode Island are contiguous and are the only counties in the nation where Portuguese Americans make up the plurality of the population. This is due to the Portuguese-American population, the Portuguese-Brazilian population, and the Portuguese-Cape Verdean population that came to Southern New England in the 19th century to do the much needed whaling work; in fact, New Bedford is called "the Whaling City."

We have been adding 10,000 new residents and consuming  of undeveloped land each year for the past thirty years, and new transportation improvements (commuter rail, Route 44 and Route 3 & 24 improvements) continue to attract more growth. Southeastern Massachusetts comprises several clearly defined sub-regions, including the South Shore, the South Coast and the Tri-City area around Brockton, Attleboro and Taunton. Despite the diversity within the region, the fifty-two cities and towns all have common concerns and opportunities.

Taunton, Brockton, Fall River, and New Bedford are the largest cities in Southeastern Massachusetts and are close to one another in size. All four have a strong Portuguese presence. In 2000, 43.9% of Fall River residents identified as being of Portuguese heritage. This is the highest percentage of Portuguese Americans in the country. Most of the population claims to be of Azorean origin, many from São Miguel Island. There are smaller, but significant presences of other Portuguese-speaking communities, such as other Azorean Islanders, Portuguese from mainland Portugal, Madeirans, Cape Verdeans, Brazilians, and Angolans. In 2000 New Bedford had the second highest percentage of Portuguese Americans with 38.6% of residents reporting that ancestry. New Bedford is also 8.0% Cape Verdean, 4.39% African American and 7.1% Puerto Rican, and 3% were other Hispanics, In 2000 it was 75% White alone.

Like most of the state, Southeastern Massachusetts is ethnically, racially, linguistically, and religiously diverse.  However, Portuguese-speakers are especially well represented in this area (especially Bristol County) due to a pattern of immigration that began in the 19th century and was tied to the whaling industry.  Today, many people in Southeastern Massachusetts, most notability Bristol County, trace their ancestry to mainland Portugal and the Azores. Quincy, Milton, and Randolph are all in Norfolk County and are included in the Southeastern Massachusetts definition; they are populated by Irish Americans, British Americans, African Americans, Asian Americans, Arab Americans and Latin Americans. Irish Americans dominate Norfolk County, Bristol County and Plymouth County which has been known as the "Irish Riviera". Cape Verdean Americans, Brazilian Americans, Angolan Americans, African Americans, Arab Americans, Irish Americans, British Americans, Portuguese Americans, Asian Americans, Latin Americans, Spanish Americans, Chinese Americans, Russian Americans, Turkish Americans, German Americans, Polish Americans, Swedish Americans, French Americans, Lebanese Americans, Italian Americans, and Greek Americans preside over Brockton, Taunton, Fall River and New Bedford.

Cities and towns 

The following tabular list shows the 12 government divisions of Southeastern Massachusetts which have been officially granted the right to use the city form of government along with the official name in use by each municipality.

Census-designated places

 Acushnet Center
 Bellingham
 Bliss Corner
 Bourne
 Brewster
 Bridgewater
 Buzzards Bay
 Cedar Crest
 Chatham
 Dennis
 Dennis Port
 Dover
 Duxbury
 East Dennis
 East Falmouth
 East Harwich
 East Sandwich
 East Taunton
 Edgartown
 Falmouth
 Forestdale
 Foxborough
 Green Harbor
 Hanson
 Harwich Center
 Harwich Port
 Kingston
 Mansfield Center
 Marion Center
 Marshfield
 Marshfield Hills
 Mashpee Neck
 Mattapoisett Center
 Medfield
 Middleborough Center
 Millis-Clicquot
 Monomoscoy Island
 Monument Beach
 New Seabury
 North Eastham
 North Falmouth
 North Lakeville
 North Pembroke
 North Plymouth
 North Scituate
 North Seekonk
 North Westport
 Northwest Harwich
 Norton Center
 Oak Bluffs
 Ocean Bluff-Brant Rock
 Ocean Grove
 Onset
 Orleans
 Plymouth ("Plymouth Center")
 Pocasset
 Popponesset
 Popponesset Island
 Provincetown
 Raynham Center
 Sagamore
 Sandwich
 Scituate
 Seabrook
 Seconsett Island
 Sharon
 Smith Mills
 South Dennis
 South Duxbury
 South Yarmouth
 Southfield
 Teaticket
 Taunton
 The Pinehills
 Vineyard Haven
 Walpole
 Wareham Center
 West Chatham
 West Dennis
 West Falmouth
 West Wareham
 West Yarmouth
 Weweantic
 White Island Shores
 Woods Hole
 Yarmouth Port

Education
Institutions of higher learning which serve Southeastern Massachusetts communities include:
Bradford Durfee College of Technology
Bridgewater State University
Bristol Community College
Cape Cod Community College
Curry College
Dean College
Massachusetts Maritime Academy
Massasoit Community College
Stonehill College
University of Massachusetts Dartmouth
University of Massachusetts School of Law
Wheaton College
Woods Hole Oceanographic Institution

Notes

References

Regions of Massachusetts